Jamuna Gurung  is an Australian businesswomen of Nepalese origin, executive director and managing director of the Melbourne Institute of Technology, in Victoria, Australia, which she co-founded with her husband, Dr Shesh Ghale.

Gurung was born in Nepal and, came to Australia in 1991 to undertake studies. She graduated with a Bachelor of Business majoring in Marketing and Management from the Swinburne University of Technology.

Net worth 
Gurung and her husband, Ghale, are the first billionaires in the global Nepalese diaspora and the only second billionaire of Nepalese origin.

Gurung and Ghale first appeared on the BRW Rich 200 in 2009, and jointly appeared on subsequent rich lists. With a net worth of approximately A$1.18 billion in 2019, Gurung and Ghale were named by The Australian Financial Review Rich List as the 78th richest Australians. They were previously ranked as the 81st-richest Australian by The Australian Financial Review in the 2018 Rich List.

Note 
 : Net worth held jointly with Shesh Ghale.

References

Living people
Date of birth missing (living people)
Nepalese emigrants to Australia
Swinburne University of Technology alumni
Year of birth missing (living people)
Australian billionaires
Female billionaires
Australian women company founders
Australian company founders
Australian people of Nepalese descent
Gurung people